Estonian Baseball and Softball Federation (abbreviation EBSF) was a baseball and softball sport governing body in Estonia.

The last president of EBSF was Tauno Koppel.

EBSF was established in 2008. and was ended 30 November 2015.

References

External links
 

Sports governing bodies in Estonia
Baseball in Estonia